There are many radio stations in Norway. For a more comprehensive list see List of Norwegian-language radio stations. Norway is in the process of transitioning all radio stations away from FM broadcasting to Digital Audio Broadcasting only. The country's national radio outlets transitioned to DAB on December 13, 2017. Local radio stations remain available in FM.

NRK

NRK radio channels are the most prominent stations in Norway. NRK radio is available on DAB and internet radio. The main channels are:

NRK P1 is the biggest channel in Norway, offering a variety of programs for the vast majority. News headlines every hour.
NRK P2 is the cultural channel, offering a daily morning news program, as well as classical music.
NRK P3 is the youth channel, with new popular and often Norwegian music.

NRK also broadcasts specialized radio channels:

NRK Sámi radio: Programs and news in Sami languages
NRK Klassisk: Classical music. It was the first DAB radio channel in the world. Originally called "NRK Alltid Klassik".
NRK Alltid Nyheter (Always news) News, replays of news programs from other NRK stations. Re-broadcasts BBC World Service at night.
NRK mP3: A variant of NRK P3, just without hosts. Broadcasts pop music, often used in gym studios.
NRK Folkemusikk: Folk music from Norway and rest of the world. Originally called "NRD Alltid Folkemusikk".
NRK Super is a radio station for children.
NRK P1+: Grew out of what was NRK Gull.
NRK Båtvær is a channel specifically for seafarers, broadcasting weather news in a loop.
NRK Jazz: Jazz music
NRK Sport broadcasts live sport.
NRK Stortinget broadcasts when parliament (Storting) is in session.

Current FM band in Oslo 

The following radio stations are located in and transmitted from Oslo, Norway. There are 17 radio stations in Oslo.

 90.1 FM – 901 ROX
 99.3 FM – Radio Nova
 104.8 FM – The Beat
 105.8 FM – RLA 105.8 (RLA – Radio Latin Amerika)
 106.8 FM – Radio Metro

Other major channels
Radio Nord Norge is the Station for the Northern region.
P4 is a commercial radio station, broadcasting popular music, with some light programs. P4 is most commonly heard in cars.
Radio Norge broadcasting popular music, similar to P4.

Regional radio stations 
These stations are available in several larger Norwegian cities:

 Radio 1
 NRJ
 Power Hit Radio
 Klem FM
 Radio Norway Direct English Radio in Norway

Local radio stations
For a list of local radio stations in Norway, see List of Norwegian radio stations.

Internet radio
Stations with a Norwegian target audience that only broadcast on the Internet:

 Ordentlig Radio

References